Vitello is a 2018 animated comedy-drama film directed by Dorte Bengtson in her directorial debut, and co-written by Bengtson and Kim Fupz Aakeson. It is based on a series of children's books by the same name by Aakeson and Niels Bo Bojesen. The voice cast includes Samuel Søby Bang as the titular character and Sidse Babett Knudsen as his mother, along with Bodil Jørgensen, Nicolaj Kopernikus, and Birthe Neumann.

Vitello was co-produced by SellOutPictures and Lars von Trier's production company Zentropa Entertainments.  It was screened at the 72nd Edinburgh International Film Festival.

Voice cast 

 Samuel Søby Bang as Vitello
 Sidse Babett Knudsen as Vitello's mother
 Bodil Jørgensen as Georgine Dame
 Nicolaj Kopernikus as Gregers
 Birthe Neumann as an elderly lady
 Eliya Coco Bülow as Kamma
 Morten Grunwald as God
 Paul Hüttel as an elderly man
 Lado Hadzic as a mailman
 Sander Herstad Lauridsen as Max and Hasse
 Otto Harald Svæverud as a sick boy and Rudi
 Adrian Seier Aarup as William

Production 
Production began in 2017. The animation is based on Aakeson's illustrations in 13 of his books about the boy Vitello.

Reception 
Amber Wilkinson at Eye For Film UK, who gave a positive review for its animation, saying: "Taking the hand-drawn style from the original books, the animation is spare and has an engaging childlike quality, with Vitello's hair and cheeks little more than cheeky scribbles. This is fitting for a film that takes the child's eye view of life, with reactions deliberately skewed to Vitello's perspective."

Accolades 
Vitello was nominated for three Robert Awards: Best Children/Youth Film, Best Adapted Screenplay, and Best Original Song.

Television adaptation 
Vitello was divided into a 13-episode television series released on July 1, 2018, with most of the cast reprise the roles, alongside Dorte Bengtson and Kim Fupz Aakeson also returns.

References 

2018 animated films
2018 comedy-drama films
British animated films
British comedy-drama films
Danish animated films
Danish comedy-drama films
Films adapted into television shows
Zentropa films